Lemgo-Lüttfeld is a railway station located in Lemgo, Germany. The station was opened on 28 July 2007 is located on the Bielefeld-Hameln railway. The train services are operated by Eurobahn.

Train services
The following services currently call at Lemgo-Lüttfeld:
RB73 Der Lipperländer Rahden - Bünde - Herford - Bielefeld - Lage - Lemgo

References

Railway stations in North Rhine-Westphalia
Railway stations in Germany opened in 2007